Robert Charles Davey (October 22, 1853 – December 26, 1908) was a U.S. Representative from Louisiana.

Born in New Orleans, Louisiana, Davey attended the public schools, and was graduated from St. Vincent's College, Cape Girardeau, Missouri, in 1871.
He engaged in mercantile pursuits.

Davey was elected to the State Senate in 1879, 1884, and again in 1892.
He served as president pro tempore of the senate during the sessions of 1884 and 1886.
He served as judge of the first recorder's court in New Orleans 1880-1888.
He was an unsuccessful candidate for mayor of New Orleans in 1888.

Davey was elected as a Democrat to the Fifty-third Congress (March 4, 1893 – March 3, 1895).
He declined to be a candidate for renomination in 1894.

Davey was elected to the Fifty-fifth and to the five succeeding Congresses and served from March 4, 1897, until his death.
Had been reelected to the Sixty-first Congress, but died in New Orleans, Louisiana, December 26, 1908, before the close of the Sixtieth Congress.
He was interred in Metairie Cemetery.

See also
List of United States Congress members who died in office (1900–49)

References

Robert C. Davey, late a Representative from Louisiana, Memorial addresses delivered in the House of Representatives and Senate frontispiece 1911

1853 births
1908 deaths
Democratic Party Louisiana state senators
Louisiana state court judges
Democratic Party members of the United States House of Representatives from Louisiana
19th-century American politicians
19th-century American judges